Jan Zdráhal (born May 26, 1991) is a Czech professional ice hockey defenceman. He currently plays with HC Pardubice of the Czech Extraliga.

Zdráhal made his Czech Extraliga debut playing with HC Pardubice during the 2011–12 Czech Extraliga season.

References

External links

1991 births
Living people
Czech ice hockey defencemen
HC Dynamo Pardubice players
HC Chrudim players
Hokej Šumperk 2003 players
SK Horácká Slavia Třebíč players
HC Dukla Jihlava players
LHK Jestřábi Prostějov players
People from Dvůr Králové nad Labem
Sportspeople from the Hradec Králové Region